Maltese euro coins feature three separate designs for the three series of coins. Malta has been a member of the European Union since 1 May 2004, and is a member of the Economic and Monetary Union of the European Union. Malta adopted the euro as its official currency on 1 January 2008, replacing the Maltese lira. For a period of one month until 31 January, there was a dual circulation for Malta where the Euro and Maltese lira were used alongside each other.

Maltese euro designs
For images of the common side and a detailed description of the coins, see euro coins.

Design selection process
The selection of the designs of the coins was decided by public consultation in two rounds. The first round of the consultation process started on 14 January 2006 and ended on 29 January 2006. During this period the Maltese public could participate in the process by choosing from a total of twelve options, divided into four design themes – Prehistoric Malta, Renaissance Malta, The Maltese Identity and The Maltese Archipelago. Three different options were presented for each theme.

The results of the first round voting were The Baptism of Christ in St John’s Co-Cathedral (3498 votes), Malta’s Coat of Arms (2742 votes) and Mnajdra Temple Altar (1872 votes). Another design, The Fort St. Angelo option, received 2037 votes, but was not included as one of the three chosen options, since the Baptism of Christ received the most votes in that theme.

Along with the visual design options, the public was also given several alternative options, which were voted on in the same manner. The first and second most popular suggestions made by the public were the Maltese cross and Dun Karm, respectively on the Maltese euro coin set. The Steering Committee for the adoption of the euro ultimately decided to include the most popular suggestion, the Maltese Cross, with the three chosen by the public.

These four finalists were then sent to a designer (Noel Galea Bason) and four designs were rendered for the second round of voting.

During the second phase, running from 29 May until 9 June 2006, the public was asked to choose the actual designs for the euro coins from the four mock ups produced by the designer. The three designs with the highest number of votes would then become the final design for the Maltese face of the euro coin set.

The results of the second round were Maltese cross, followed by the Coat of arms of Malta and the Mnajdra Temples.

The Central Bank of Malta released the final designs of the euro coins on 19 February 2007.

On 23 October 2007, the designs were officially published in the Official Journal of the European Union.

Mintage quantities

Mints
2008, 2016-2018: France
2010-2015: Netherlands

Identifying marks

€2 commemorative coins

Other commemorative coins (Collectors' coins)

Malta joined the Eurozone in 2008 and they have minted several collectors' coins in silver and gold. Their face value range from 10 to 50 euro. This is mainly done as a legacy of old national practice of minting gold and silver coins. These coins are not intended to be used as means of payment, so they do not circulate.

See also

 Malta in the European Union

References

External links

European Central Bank – Malta

Euro coins by issuing country
Euro coins
Euro